VEU Feldkirch is a professional ice hockey team from Feldkirch, Austria. The team currently plays in the Ö Eishockey Liga. They Play Their Home Games At Vorarlberghalle. They formerly Play in the Austrian National League and Alps Hockey League. And VEU Feldkirch were nine-time Austrian ice hockey champions when they played in the higher level Austrian Hockey League, before being relegated. Their biggest success was the win of the European Hockey League in 1998 with its coach Ralph Krueger.

References

External links
Official website 

Ice hockey teams in Austria
Inter-National League teams
Former Austrian Hockey League teams
Austrian National League teams
Interliga (1999–2007) teams
Alpenliga teams
Ice hockey clubs established in 1945
1945 establishments in Austria